Silveiras may refer to the following places:

Silveiras, a town in the state of São Paulo, Brazil
Silveiras (Montemor-o-Novo), a parish in the Montemor-o-Novo Municipality, Portugal

See also

Silveira
Silva (disambiguation)